Citharodactylus is a genus of monogeneans in the family Gyrodactylidae. It consists of one species, Citharodactylus gagei Přikrylová, Shinn & Paladini, 2017.

References

Gyrodactylidae
Monogenea genera
Monotypic platyhelminthes genera